Pilatus was a Maltese bank located in Ta' Xbiex. The bank created in 2013 and closed in 2018.

History 

Pilatus Bank started its operations in January 2014. Its owner was Seyed Ali Sadr Hasheminejad, known as Ali Sadr. The bank came into the spotlight after reporter Daphne Caruana Galizia accused the bank of laundering funds from allegedly corrupt schemes on behalf of offshore companies and individuals. After an 18-month investigation by a magistrate in Malta, it was determined the claims were untrue.

Ali Sadr was charged with violating US sanctions against Iran in the United States in March 2018. Found guilty at trial, the court decision was reversed in July 2020 with the charges being dropped.

On 4 November 2018, the bank had their banking license revoked by the European Central Bank (ECB). Following the release of Ali Sadr in 2020, Pilatus is taking legal action through the European Court of Justice for the return of the banking license and for damages against the ECB. In September 2022, the International Centre for Settlement of Investment Disputes has called on Malta to halt any possible legal action against Ali Sadr. Sadr is claiming Maltese Authorities that namely the MFSA and FIAU have personally prosecuted him and violated his rights.

See also 
 List of banks in Malta

References

External links 
 Pilatus Bank in the Offshore Leaks Database by ICIJ

Banks of Malta
Banks established in 2014
2014 establishments in Malta
2019 Malta political crisis
Investment banks